Gusevka is a rural locality (a settlement) in Ramonskoye Rural Settlement, Anninsky District, Voronezh Oblast, Russia. The population was 93 as of 2010. There are 3 streets.

Geography 
Gusevka is located 51 km east of Anna (the district's administrative centre) by road. Ramonye is the nearest rural locality.

References 

Rural localities in Anninsky District